The 1967–68 Bulgarian Cup was the 28th season of the Bulgarian Cup (in this period the tournament was named Cup of the Soviet Army). Spartak Sofia won the competition for the first and only time, beating Beroe Stara Zagora 3–2 after extra time in the final at the Vasil Levski National Stadium.

First round

|}

Group stage

Group 1
Matches were played in Yambol and Stara Zagora

|}

Group 2
Matches were played in Plovdiv, Pazardzhik and Asenovgrad

|}

Group 3
Matches were played in Dupnitsa and Blagoevgrad

|}

Group 4
Matches were played in Dimitrovgrad and Haskovo

|}

Semi-finals

Final

Details

References

1967-68
1967–68 domestic association football cups
Cup